Admiral of Flanders (1383–1483) and Admiral of the Netherlands (1485–1573) was a title in the medieval Low Countries for the commander of the war fleet.

The title of admiral (from the Arab emir-al-bahr), for naval commanders of ships which protected commercial convoys against piracy, already existed temporary in the different parts of the Low Countries before, but was first made permanent in Flanders by Louis II of Flanders in 1383.

When the Burgundians gained control of the Low Countries, they also created a permanent position of admiral for the rest of the Burgundian Netherlands in 1446. 

After the failed Flemish revolt against Maximilian of Austria (1482–1485), both positions were united and Philip of Cleves was appointed as first Admiral of the Netherlands.

With the start of the Dutch Revolt in 1568 and the defeat and imprisonment of the last Admiral Maximilien de Hénin-Liétard in the Battle on the Zuiderzee against the rebels, the position was abolished.

Sources
  (1976-1978): Maritieme geschiedenis der Nederlanden, De Boer Maritiem, Bussum
  (1998): Zeemacht en onmacht, Maritieme politiek in de Nederlanden, 1488 -1558, De Bataafsche Leeuw, Amsterdam, 

Maritime history
Military history of the North Sea
History of Flanders
Military history of the Netherlands
1440s establishments in the Burgundian Netherlands
Habsburg Netherlands